Whooooehebdnakakdnfb
Eoophyla leroii is a moth in the family Crambidae. It was described by Embrik Strand in 1915. It is found in Botswana, Cameroon, the Republic of the Congo, the Democratic Republic of the Congo, Nigeria, Sierra Leone, Sudan and Uganda. The habitat consists of areas near rivers and swampy places.

The wingspan is 11–15 mm. The forewings are white with fuscous markings along the costa. The hindwings are white with a dark fuscous antemedian fascia. Adults have been recorded on wing from January to February, from April to May, in August, October and November.

References

Eoophyla
Moths described in 1915